Weekend in Paradise ( or ) is a 1952 West German comedy film directed by Kurt Hoffmann and starring Paul Dahlke, Margaret Cargill and Christiane Jansen. It was shot at the Wandsbek Studios in Hamburg and on location in Malente, Plön, Eutin and the Dieksee. The film's sets were designed by the art directors Willi Herrmann and Heinrich Weidemann. It is a remake of the 1931 film of the same title.

Cast
 Paul Dahlke as Regierungsrat Dittjen
 Margaret Cargill as Vicky Dittjen
 Christiane Jansen as Olivia Dittjen
 Carola Höhn as Dr. Wilma Linde
 Carsta Löck as Adele Schild
 Walter Giller as Ewald Bach
 Helmuth M. Backhaus as Conferencier
 Stig Roland as Otto Giersdorf
 Harald Paulsen as Limonadenschulze
 Hubert von Meyerinck as Empfangschef
 Karin Jacobsen as Die Blonde
 Erich Ponto as Giersdorfs Onkel
 Hans Stiebner as August Badrian
 Udo Baustian as Hubs

References

Bibliography
 Thomas Koebner. Filmregisseure: Biographien, Werkbeschreibungen, Filmographien. Reclam, 2008.

External links 
 

1952 films
1952 comedy films
West German films
German comedy films
1950s German-language films
Films directed by Kurt Hoffmann
Remakes of German films
German films based on plays
German black-and-white films
1950s German films